Iona Caroline Heath  is an English medical doctor and writer who was president of the Royal College of General Practitioners (RCGP) from 2009 to 2012.

Iona retired from medical practice aged 60years in 2010,  She was the only person ever to have applied for and anticipated taking up the post of President of RCGP 2009–2012 when she was no longer a practicing doctor for the majority of the term of office, i.e. during 2010–2012.

Career
Heath graduated from Cambridge University in 1974. She worked as a GP in Kentish Town in London from 1975 to 2010.

She was first elected a member of RCGP's council in 1989. In June 2009 she was elected President of the RCGP. She was on the WONCA World council of general practice. She developed a second career by becoming a speaker at national and international events and acting as an adviser to practising doctors.

Iona chaired a controversial dispute over the calls to retract a publication on statins in the bmj  The conclusion not to retract in full was disputed the Lancet queried the independence of the panel
In 2014 she chaired a panel looking into the side-effects of statins.

In 2022 she was still contributing to The Lancet - defending the importance of empathy.

Honours
She was made Commander of the Order of the British Empire (CBE) in the 2000 New Year Honours for services to the Care of Elderly People.

Publications
 Matters of Life and Death: Key Writings,  Routledge,  2007 
 The mystery of general practice, Nuffield Trust, 1995

References

Living people
20th-century English medical doctors
21st-century English medical doctors
British general practitioners
English women medical doctors
Fellows of the Royal College of General Practitioners
Commanders of the Order of the British Empire
Alumni of the University of Cambridge
Place of birth missing (living people)
20th-century women physicians
21st-century women physicians
Year of birth missing (living people)
20th-century English women
20th-century English people
21st-century English women